Babine, British Columbia (population ~159) is a town in British Columbia. Its elevation is 2552 ft.

Omineca Country